Andrei Vyacheslavovich Galyanov (born 5 April 1973) is a Russian former professional footballer.

Club career
He made his professional debut in the Soviet Second League B in 1990 for FC Spartak Kostroma. He played 4 games in the UEFA Intertoto Cup 1998 for FC Shinnik Yaroslavl.

References

1973 births
Footballers from Yaroslavl
Living people
Soviet footballers
Russian footballers
Association football midfielders
Russian Premier League players
FC Shinnik Yaroslavl players
FC Baltika Kaliningrad players
FC Spartak Kostroma players
FC Chita players